PMAB may refer to:

PMAB, the Presbyterian Mission Agency Board of the Presbyterian Church (USA)
PMAB, the Department of Pharmacological, Medical and Agronomical Biotechnology at the University of Science and Technology of Hanoi